The 1900 United States elections elected the 57th United States Congress. The election was held during the Fourth Party System. Republicans retained control of the Presidency and both houses of Congress, while third parties suffered defeats.

In a re-match of the 1896 presidential election, Republican President William McKinley defeated Democratic former Representative William Jennings Bryan of Nebraska. McKinley's previous running mate, Vice President Garret Hobart, had died in office, so the Republicans nominated New York Governor Theodore Roosevelt as their vice presidential candidate. McKinley again won by a comfortable margin in both the popular vote and the electoral college, and he picked up a handful of states in the West and the Midwest. McKinley's win made him the first sitting President to win re-election since Ulysses S. Grant in 1872.

Republicans won minor gains in the House, maintaining their majority.

In the Senate, the Democrats made moderate gains while the Populist Party lost three seats. Republicans continued to maintain a commanding majority in the chamber.

See also
1900 United States presidential election
1900 United States House of Representatives elections
1900–01 United States Senate elections

References

Further reading

 Beeby, James M. "Red Shirt Violence, Election Fraud, and the Demise of the Populist Party in North Carolina's Third Congressional District, 1900." North Carolina Historical Review 85.1 (2008): 1-28. online
 Bloch, Herman D. "The New York Afro-American's Struggle for Political Rights and the Emergence of Political Recognition, 1865–1900." International Review of Social History 13.3 (1968): 321-349. online
 Brands, Henry William. The reckless decade: America in the 1890s (U of Chicago Press, 2002).
 Brown, M. Craig, and Barbara D. Warner. "Immigrants, urban politics, and policing in 1900." American Sociological Review (1992): 293-305. online

 Connolly, James J. The Triumph of Ethnic Progressivism: Urban Political Culture in Boston, 1900-1925 (Harvard UP, 2009).
 Fishel, Leslie H. "The Negro in Northern Politics, 1870-1900." Mississippi Valley Historical Review 42.3 (1955): 466-489. online
 Hair, William Ivy. Bourbonism and Agrarian Protest: Louisiana Politics, 1877--1900 (LSU Press, 1969).

 Hilpert, John M. (2015) American Cyclone: Theodore Roosevelt and His 1900 Whistle-Stop Campaign (U Press of Mississippi, 2015), 349 pp. 
 Kalisch, Philip A. "The Black Death in Chinatown: Plague and Politics in San Francisco 1900-1904." Arizona and the West 14.2 (1972): 113-136. online
 McKinney, Gordon B. Southern Mountain Republicans 1865-1900: Politics and the Appalachian Community (U North Carolina Press, 1978).
 Moneyhon, Carl H. "Black Politics in Arkansas during the Gilded Age, 1876-1900." Arkansas Historical Quarterly 44.3 (1985): 222-245. online

 Quince, Charles. Resistance to the Spanish-American and Philippine Wars: Anti-imperialism and the Role of the Press, 1895-1902 (McFarland, 2017).

 Thelen, David Paul. The new citizenship: Origins of progressivism in Wisconsin, 1885-1900 (U of Missouri Press, 1972).

Primary sources
 Bryan, William Jennings. "The Election of 1900," pp. 788–801 Bryan gives his analysis of why he lost
 Stevenson, Adlai E., et al. "Bryan or McKinley? The Present Duty of American Citizens," The North American Review Vol. 171, No. 527 (Oct. 1900), pp. 433–516 in JSTOR political statements by politicians on all sides, including Adlai E. Stevenson, B. R. Tillman, Edward M. Shepard, Richard Croker, Erving Winslow, Charles Emory Smith, G. F. Hoar, T. C. Platt, W. M. Stewart, Andrew Carnegie, and James H. Eckels

1900 elections in the United States
1900